Jim Murray (born 1938 or 1939) is the co-founder of the Ronald McDonald House and a former General Manager of the Philadelphia Eagles.  A native of West Philadelphia, he is also president of Jim Murray Ltd, a sports promotion and marketing firm.

Early life and education
Murray was born into an Irish Catholic family. He was raised in a rowhouse in West Philadelphia, Pennsylvania. Murray attended Our Mother of Sorrows Parish grade school and West Philadelphia Catholic High School. He and his brother Francis W. "Fran" Murray were athletic.

He graduated from Villanova University in 1960.

Career
He began his career in sports administration with the Tidewater Tides of baseball's South Atlantic League. After a tour of active duty with the Marine Corps Reserve, he returned to baseball as assistant general manager of the Atlanta Crackers, an affiliate of the St. Louis Cardinals. In 1964, he left baseball to enter the restaurant business. He returned om 1966 to his alma mater, Villanova University, as its sports information director.

In 1969, he joined the professional football team Philadelphia Eagles' public relations staff and became the NFL team's administrative assistant two years later. In 1974, five years after joining the organization, Murray was named general manager for the team. For more than nine years, Murray served as general manager which included significant improvement in the team, as evidenced by its appearances in playoff games and a Super Bowl. In 1976, he and owner Leonard Tose hired Dick Vermeil as head coach. Murray was fired after the 1982 season and succeeded by Tose's daughter, Susan Tose Fletcher.

Film and television
Murray's company has produced the local television show Eagles Cheers.
 
He appears in interviews on numerous NFL Films Productions about the Philadelphia Eagles.

Murray's nephew T. Patrick Murray (son of his brother Fran) is a filmmaker who produced The Last Game, a football documentary film for ESPN.

Charity work
During his 14 years with the Eagles, Murray assumed leadership roles in a number of community projects. He helped start the successful Eagles Fly for Leukemia campaign and co-founded with Dr. Audrey Evans the first Ronald McDonald House, located in Philadelphia. Murray persuaded many of his peers in the NFL to become involved in the unique Ronald McDonald House concept.

Awards
Murray has received numerous honors and awards, including: 
 Leonard Tose Award (2002), first awardee
 American Medical Association's Citizen of the Year Award (1999)
 American Legion Distinguished Service Award (1992) 
 Pennsylvania Sports Hall of Fame Philadelphia City All-Star Chapter (inducted 1992)
 President Ronald Reagan's Medal for Volunteers of America (1987) 
 Bakers Club of Philadelphia's Bert Bell Man of the Year Award (1983)
 Catholic Leadership Institute's Award for Outstanding Catholic Leadership (2005)

Personal life
Murray and his wife, Dianne, reside in Rosemont, Pennsylvania. They have five children and five grandchildren.

See also
 Vince Papale

References

Sportspeople from Philadelphia
American people of Irish descent
American Roman Catholics
Philadelphia Eagles executives
National Football League general managers
Villanova Wildcats football
Living people
1930s births
United States Marines
Villanova University alumni
United States Marine Corps reservists